John F. Quan (November 4, 1944 – June 26, 1988) was a former Democratic Party of Guam politician in Guam. Quan served as a senator in the Guam Legislature for 4 terms.

Early life

Education 
Quan earned a Master of Arts degree from Marquette University in 1977.

Career 
Quan was commissioned as a 2nd Lieutenant of the Army Reserve and was eventually promoted to Captain.

Quan first successfully ran as a senator in the Guam Legislature in 1978 and was re-elected to two consecutive terms. He did not win a seat in the Guam Legislature when he ran in 1984, but returned following the 1986 general election, where he placed 21st.

Elections

Accomplishments
Quan authored the public law which established the Guam Micronesia Island Fair.

Personal life
Quan was married to Veronica Enverga Santos, a Filipino from Makati, Metro Manila. The two had met as students in Marquette University, and married in the Philippines. Together they had two sons, Jonathan R. Quan, a magistrate judge of the Superior Court of Guam,  and James F. Quan, a black belt jiu-jitsu champion and instructor, as well as two grandchildren.

He is buried at Our Lady of Peace Memorial Gardens in Yona, Guam.

Legacy
Quan was honored posthumously by the establishment of the John F. Quan Memorial Scholarships in Oceanic Research by Guam Public Law 19-37.

References

External links
 

1944 births
1988 deaths
20th-century American politicians
Chamorro people
Guamanian Democrats
Members of the Legislature of Guam